Guillaume Suon (born 26 November 1982) is a French-Cambodian filmmaker.

Career 

Guillaume Suon has focused his first documentary films on Cambodia’s history and contemporary society.

Trained by the Oscar-nominated filmmaker Rithy Panh, Guillaume Suon is an alumnus of the Berlinale Talent Campus and a fellow of the Sundance Institute and the IDFAcademy.

Filmography

References 

1982 births
Living people
French documentary film directors
Cambodian documentary film directors